Konstantin von Benckendorff (Konstantin Khristoforovich Benkendorf; 31 January 1785 – 6 August 1828) was a Baltic German general and diplomat.

Life and career
Konstantin von Benckendorff was born into Russia's distinctive Baltic nobility to a Baltic German family in Saint Petersburg, son of General Baron  (12 January 1749, Fredrikshamn - 10 June 1823, Kolga), who served as the military governor of Livonia, and wife Baroness Anna Juliane Charlotte Schilling von Canstatt (31 July 1744, Thalheim - 11 March 1797, Riga), who held a high position at the Romanov Court as senior lady-in-waiting and best friend of Empress Maria Fyodorovna, and paternal grandson of Johann Michael von Benckendorff and wife Sophie von Löwenstern.

His brother Alexander von Benckendorff (1783–1844) was also a general and statesman, and his sister Dorothea von Lieven was a political force famous at London, St. Petersburg, and Paris. His other sister Maria von Benckendorff (14 February 1784 - 16 November 1841) married Ivan Georgievich Sevitsch.

Trained as a diplomat, he joined the army to take part in the concluding stages of the Napoleonic Wars, specifically in the taking of Kassel, Fulda, Hanau, Reims, and Soissons. After the war, Benckendorff returned to diplomacy.

Five years later, he was appointed Minister Plenipotentiary to Baden and Stuttgart. With the outbreak of the Russo-Persian War he returned to Russia, captured Echmiadzin and routed the Kurds near Erivan. He then crossed the Araks River and defeated the Persian cavalry. Benckendorff died of a fever that swept through the Russian army at the beginning of the Russo-Turkish War, 1828–1829.

Konstantin married on 1 September 1814 Natalia von Alopaeus (4 February 1796, Berlin – 29 January 1823, Stuttgart). They couple had two children:

 Count Konstantin Alexander von Benckendorff (22 October 1816, Berlin – 29 January 1858, Paris), married in Potsdam on 20 June 1848 to Princess Louise Constantine Nathalie Johanne von Croy (2 November 1825 – 8 January 1890) 
 Countess Marie von Benckendorff (1818 – 31 October 1844, St. Petersburg), married to Prince Pavel Matveyevich Golenischev-Kutuzov-Tolstoi (20 November 1800 – 27 February 1883).

Honours and awards
 Order of St. Anna
2nd class, with diamonds - 1812
1st class - 17 April 1823
Diamonds added to 1st class - 16 February 1824
 Order of St. George
4th class - 8 February 1813
3rd class - 10 September 1815
 Order of St. Vladimir
4th class - 25 January 1812
3rd class - 18 September 1813
2nd class - 22 July 1827
 Order of the Red Eagle, 2nd class (Prussia)
 Knight First Class of the Order of the Sword (Sweden)
 Knight of the Military Order of Max Joseph (Bavaria)
 Imperial Order of Leopold (Austria)
 Golden Sword with the inscription "For Bravery", with diamonds, twice (1814 and 1 January 1828)
 Silver medal "In memory of the War of 1812"

References

Further reading
 Judith Lissauer Cromwell, "Dorothea Lieven: A Russian Princess in London and Paris, 1785-1857" (McFarland & Co. 2007)

External links
 Biography 

1725 births
1828 deaths
People from Saint Petersburg
People from Saint Petersburg Governorate
Baltic-German people
Russian nobility
Imperial Russian Army generals
Russian commanders of the Napoleonic Wars
19th-century Estonian people
Recipients of the Order of St. Vladimir, 2nd class
Recipients of the Order of St. Anna, 1st class
Recipients of the Order of St. George of the Third Degree
Knights First Class of the Order of the Sword
Knights of the Military Order of Max Joseph
Recipients of the Gold Sword for Bravery